Freeheat are a British indie rock band formed by Jim Reid and Ben Lurie of The Jesus and Mary Chain and Romi Mori and Nick Sanderson of The Gun Club.  

After releasing an EP, Don't Worry Be Happy (later released with a bonus track as Retox), their debut album, Back on the Water was released, after several delays, on 13 June 2006, on Planting Seeds Records, a label mostly known for indie pop recordings. 

Jim Reid has also continued recording and touring under his own name, both solo, and with his sister's act, Sister Vanilla.

Discography

EPs and albums 
Don't Worry Be Happy EP (2000)
The Two of Us
 Facing Up to the Facts
 Shine On Little Star
 Nobody's Gonna Trip My WireRetox EP (2002)
 The Two of Us
 Facing Up to the Facts
 Shine On Little Star
 The Long Goodbye
 Nobody's Gonna Trip My WireBack on the Water (2006) (official site)
 Keep On Truckin'
 What Goes Around (live)
 Back on the Water (live)
 The Story So Far
 Everything
 Dead End Kids (live)
 Get On Home
 Facing Up to the Facts (live)
 Shine On Little Star
 Get On Home (live)
 Down
 The Two of Us (live)
 The Real Deal
 Shine On Little Star (live)
 Don't Look Back
 K Moon (live)
 Baby G2 (live)

Compilations 
Sunsets and Silhouettes (2004)
 Back on the Water

External links
Freeheat Official Home Page
Planting Seeds Records, Freeheat's US label
Some Candy Talking forum for fans

British indie rock groups